The 2021 season was North West Thunder's second season, in which they competed in the 50 over Rachael Heyhoe Flint Trophy and the new Twenty20 competition, the Charlotte Edwards Cup. The side finished seventh in the group stage of the Rachael Heyhoe Flint Trophy, winning three of their seven matches. In the Charlotte Edwards Cup, the side finished third in Group B, winning two of their six matches, with one ending in a tie.
 
The side was captained by Alex Hartley and coached by Paul Shaw. They played four home matches at Chester Boughton Hall Cricket Club, as well as one apiece at Old Trafford and Rookwood Cricket Ground.

Squad
North West Thunder announced their initial 18-player squad on 27 May 2021. Seren Smale was promoted to the senior squad from the Academy during the season, and played her first match on 10 September 2021. Age given is at the start of North West Thunder's first match of the season (29 May 2021).

Rachael Heyhoe Flint Trophy

Season standings

 Advanced to the final
 Advanced to the play-off

Fixtures

Tournament statistics

Batting

Source: ESPN Cricinfo Qualification: 100 runs.

Bowling

Source: ESPN Cricinfo Qualification: 5 wickets.

Charlotte Edwards Cup

Group B

 Advanced to the semi-final

Fixtures

Tournament statistics

Batting

Source: ESPN Cricinfo Qualification: 50 runs.

Bowling

Source: ESPN Cricinfo Qualification: 5 wickets.

Season statistics

Batting

Bowling

Fielding

Wicket-keeping

References

North West Thunder seasons
2021 in English women's cricket